Slender Man is a 2018 American supernatural horror film directed by Sylvain White and written by David Birke, based on the character of the same name. The film stars Joey King, Julia Goldani Telles, Taylor Richardson, Jaz Sinclair, Annalise Basso, and Alex Fitzalan with Javier Botet as the title character.

Development of the film began in May 2016, with Birke hired to write the script and much of the cast signing on a year later. Filming took place in Massachusetts in June and July 2017.

Released in the United States on August 10, 2018, the film grossed over $52 million worldwide and was panned by critics. For her performance, Sinclair was nominated for the Golden Raspberry Award for Worst Supporting Actress.

Plot
In a small town in Massachusetts, four friends—Wren, Hallie Knudsen, Chloe, and Katie Jensen—summon the Slender Man. A week later, Katie disappears, and the other three girls go to her house to look for clues. The three discover that Katie had been involved in the occult and that she had been in contact, online, with a girl who told her how to contact Slender Man. Katie, being unhappy living alone with her alcoholic father, wanted the Slender Man to take her.

After talking to the same girl Katie had, the three girls decide to make contact with the Slender Man in an attempt to get Katie back in exchange for something that they love. Wren brings some handmade pottery, Chloe a picture of her and her dad before he died and Hallie brings her little sister Lizzie’s blanket, made by their grandmother. Wren, who has researched Slender Man mythology, warns Hallie and Chloe not to open their eyes while the three are making contact with the Slender Man for fear of death or madness. Chloe panics, opens her eyes, and comes face to face with the Slender Man. Sometime later, the Slender Man enters Chloe's house and drives her insane.

Wren, suffering from frightening visions, searches for a solution while Hallie unsuccessfully attempts to move on. Soon, Lizzie, Hallie's younger sister, suffers a major panic attack and is sent to the hospital and sedated. Hallie discovers Wren had attempted to come into contact with the Slender Man again, with the help of Lizzie.

Hallie confronts Wren about her sister. Wren tells Hallie that the sacrifices they gave Slender Man were not enough; Slender Man only wants the girls and won’t stop until he takes them. Suddenly, the window breaks and Wren is wrapped in tree branches, taken by Slender Man. Hallie, realizing that the only way to save Lizzie is to give herself to the Slender Man, sacrifices herself for her sister. Lizzie is able to recover and reflects on the situation that resulted in the death of her sister and her sister's friends.

Cast
Joey King as Wren
Julia Goldani Telles as Hallie Knudsen
Jaz Sinclair as Chloe
Annalise Basso as Katie Jensen
Alex Fitzalan as Tom, Hallie's love interest
Taylor Richardson as Lizzie Knudsen, Hallie's younger sister
Javier Botet as Slender Man
Kevin Chapman as Mr. Jensen, Katie's alcoholic father
Jessica Blank as Mrs. Knudsen, Hallie and Lizzie's mother
Michael Reilly Burke as Mr. Knudsen, Hallie and Lizzie's father

Production

In May 2016, news outlets reported that Sony Pictures had started developing Slender Man, a film based on the supernatural mythical character created by Eric Knudsen, with the screenplay to be written by David Birke. Sony's Screen Gems was in talks with Mythology Entertainment, Madhouse Entertainment, and It Is No Dream Entertainment to produce and distribute the project.

In January 2017, Sylvain White was announced as the director of the film and the producers would be Mythology's James Vanderbilt, and William Sherak, Madhouse's Robyn Meisinger, and No Dream's Sarah Snow. Ramin Djawadi and Brandon Campbell composed the score for the film.

Prior to the release, the producers shopped the film to other distributors following disagreements with the studio regarding the release and marketing strategy. After the film was released, Bloody Disgusting reported that Screen Gems had required the producers to meet a R MPAA rating and that several scenes had been cut over fears of public backlash (including several scenes that had appeared in trailers), resulting in narrative and continuity issues in the final film.

In May 2017, Lea van Acken, Julia Goldani Telles, Jaz Sinclair, Annalise Basso, Talitha Bateman, and Alex Fitzalan joined the cast. In July 2017, Kevin Chapman was also added, to play an emotionally defeated, alcoholic father.

Principal photography on the film began on June 19, 2017, in Boston and concluded on July 28, 2017.

Marketing 
On January 2, 2018, the first teaser poster was revealed, with a teaser trailer the following day. Reactions were mixed, with some online publications describing the trailer as taking a "traditional, low-budget horror route". Other publications noted the film's release coming four years after the Slender Man stabbing in Waukesha County, Wisconsin in 2014. After the trailer's online debut, Bill Weier, the father of one of the children convicted in the stabbing, protested the film's production and release as "extremely distasteful" and advised local theaters to not screen the film. A second trailer was released on July 26, 2018.

Release 
Slender Man was released on August 10, 2018. It was previously slated for May 18, and then August 24, 2018. Marcus Theatres did not show the film at their locations in Milwaukee and Waukesha counties in Wisconsin due to the impacts of the real-life events in the area.

Home media
Slender Man was released on Digital HD on October 19, 2018, and on Blu-ray and DVD on October 31, 2018 by Sony Pictures Home Entertainment.

Reception

Box office
Slender Man grossed $30.6 million in the United States and Canada, and $21.2 million in other territories, for a total worldwide gross of $51.7 million.

In the United States and Canada, Slender Man was released alongside The Meg and BlacKkKlansman, and was projected to gross $9–12 million from 2,109 theaters in its opening weekend. The film made $4.9 million on its first day, including $1 million from Thursday night previews, and went on to debut to $11.3 million, finishing fourth at the box office. It fell 56% to $5 million in its second weekend, finishing eighth.

Critical response
The website's critical consensus reads, "Slender Man might be thin, but he's positively robust compared to the flimsy assortment of scares generated by the would-be chiller that bears his name." On Metacritic, the film has a weighted average score of 30 out of 100 based on 15 critics, indicating "generally unfavorable reviews". Audiences polled by CinemaScore gave the film an average grade of "D−" on an A+ to F scale, while PostTrak reported filmgoers gave it an "awful" 38% positive score; social media monitor RelishMix noted that "the majority's feeling toward [the] film" was negative.

David Ehrlich of IndieWire gave the film a D, writing "a tasteless and inedibly undercooked serving of the Internet's stalest creepypasta, Slender Man aspires to be for the YouTube era what The Ring was to the last gasps of the VHS generation. But... there's one fundamental difference that sets the two movies apart: The Ring is good, and Slender Man is terrible."

Accolades

Jaz Sinclair was nominated at the 2019 Golden Raspberry Award as Worst Supporting Actress for her performance in this film.

See also
Slender: The Eight Pages
Slender: The Arrival
 Marble Hornets
 Always Watching: A Marble Hornets Story
 Beware the Slenderman

References

External links 
 

 
 
 

2010s teen horror films
2010s monster movies
2018 horror films
Films directed by Sylvain White
Films scored by Ramin Djawadi
American monster movies
American supernatural horror films
American teen horror films
Films about child abduction in the United States
Films based on mythology
Films set in Massachusetts
Films shot in Massachusetts
Films with screenplays by David Birke
American mystery horror films
Obscenity controversies in film
Film controversies
Screen Gems films
Slender Man
Films based on Internet-based works
2010s English-language films
2010s American films